Dragon land may refer to:
Dragonland, a Swedish symphonic power metal musical group
Dragon Tales, a children's cartoon show set in Dragon Land
Dragon Land, a game developed by Social Point